Rat in the Kitchen is the seventh album by UB40, released in July 1986. This album contained two UK hits, "Sing Our Own Song" (UK No. 5 in 1986) and "Rat in Mi Kitchen" (UK No. 12 in 1987). The album itself reached 8 in the UK album charts in 1986 staying in the charts for twenty weeks. The album provoked a positive reception from critics.

Reception 
AllMusic said the album was "as usual, a tuneful collection of reggae" and later described the album as "edgy".

Track listing 
All tracks composed by UB40
"All I Want to Do" – 5:33
"You Could Meet Somebody" – 4:52
"Tell It Like It Is" – 3:36
"The Elevator" – 3:25
"Watchdogs" – 4:18
"Rat in Mi Kitchen" – 6:58
"Looking Down at My Reflection" – 3:27
"Don't Blame Me" – 3:36
"Sing Our Own Song" – 7:21

Personnel 
The guest vocalists who appeared on the album were Mo Birch, Jaki Graham & Ruby Turner
Herb Alpert (co-founder of A&M Records) played trumpet on "Rat in Mi Kitchen"

Charts

Weekly charts

Year-end charts

Certifications and sales

References

Follow-up 
Following the success of the album, UB40 decided to record a new "sister" studio album. The eventual album, UB40, saw release in 1988 and contained eleven further tracks, including the single "Dancing with the Devil".

1986 albums
A&M Records albums
Reggae albums
UB40 albums

Virgin Records albums